Yeniabad (also, Bitdili and Bittili) is a village and municipality in the Shamkir Rayon of Azerbaijan.  It has a population of 1,671.

References 

Populated places in Shamkir District